Gene Nelson (born Leander Eugene Berg; March 24, 1920 – September 16, 1996) was an American actor, dancer, screenwriter, and director.

Biography
Born Leander Eugene Berg in Astoria, Oregon, he and his family moved to Seattle when he was one year old.  He was inspired to become a dancer during his childhood by watching Fred Astaire in films. After serving in the Army during World War II, during which he also performed in the musical This Is the Army, Nelson landed his first Broadway role in Lend an Ear. His performance earned a Theatre World Award. He also appeared onstage in Good News. Nelson's longtime professional dance partner during the 1950s was actress JoAnn Dean Killingsworth.

Nelson co-starred with Doris Day in Lullaby of Broadway in 1951.  He played Will Parker in the film Oklahoma!

In 1959, he appeared in Northwest Passage as a young man trying to prove his innocence in a murder case. Nelson appeared on the March 17, 1960 episode of "You Bet Your Life", hosted by Groucho Marx.  He and Groucho's daughter, Melinda, performed a dance number together.

Nelson directed eight episodes of The Rifleman in the 1961–62 season. He also directed episodes of the original Star Trek, I Dream of Jeannie (the first season), Gunsmoke (and starred in many others including “Saludos” (1959) & “Say Uncle" [S6E4), The Silent Force, and The San Pedro Beach Bums.  Nelson directed the Elvis Presley films Kissin' Cousins (1964), for which he also wrote the screenplay, and Harum Scarum (1965). For the Kissin' Cousins screenplay he received a Writers Guild of America award nomination for best written musical. In the late 1980s, he taught in the Theater Arts Department at San Francisco State University.

He starred as Buddy in the 1971 Broadway musical Follies, for which he received a 1972 Tony Award nomination for Featured Actor in a Musical. The production featured a score by Stephen Sondheim, was co-directed by Michael Bennett and Harold Prince, and co-starred Alexis Smith and Dorothy Collins.

In 1990, for contributions to the motion picture industry, Nelson was inducted into the Hollywood Walk of Fame. His star is located at 7005 Hollywood Boulevard.

Death
Nelson died of cancer, aged 76, in Los Angeles.

Filmography

Actor

 Second Fiddle (1939) as Minor Role (uncredited)
 Everything Happens at Night (1939) as Skater (uncredited)
 This Is the Army (1943) as Soldier (uncredited)
 I Wonder Who's Kissing Her Now (1947) as Tommy Yale
 Gentleman's Agreement (1947) as Second Ex-GI in Restaurant (uncredited)
 The Walls of Jericho (1948) as Assistant Prosecutor (uncredited)
 Apartment for Peggy (1948) as Jerry (uncredited)
 The Daughter of Rosie O'Grady (1950) as Doug Martin
 Tea for Two (1950) as Tommy Trainor
 The West Point Story (1950) as Hal Courtland
 Lullaby of Broadway (1951) as Tom Farnham
 Painting the Clouds with Sunshine (1951) as Ted Lansing
 Starlift (1951) as Gene Nelson
 She's Working Her Way Through College (1952) as Don Weston
 She's Back on Broadway (1953) as Gordon Evans
 Crime Wave (1953) as Steve Lacey
 Three Sailors and a Girl (1954) as Twitch
 So This Is Paris (1954) as Al Howard
 The Atomic Man (1955) as Mike Delaney
 Oklahoma! (1955) as Will Parker
 The Way Out (1956) as Greg Carradine
 Little New Orleans Girl (1956) as Gregory Gold
 Shangri-La (1960, TV movie) as Robert
 20,000 Eyes (1961) as Dan Warren
 The Purple Hills (1961) as Gil Shepard
 Thunder Island (1963) as Billy Poole
 Family Flight (1972, TV Movie) as Aircraft Carrier Captain
 S.O.B. (1981) as Clive Lytell

Director

 Life with Archie (1962, TV Movie)
 Hand of Death (1962)
 Hootenanny Hoot (1963)
 Your Cheatin' Heart (1964)
 Kissin' Cousins (1964)
 Archie (1964, TV Movie)
 Harum Scarum (1965)
 I Dream of Jeannie (1965, Season 1)
 Where's Everett (1966, TV Movie)
 The Cool Ones (1967)
 Wake Me When the War Is Over (1969, TV Movie)
 The Letters (1973, TV Movie)
 Dan August: The Jealousy Factor (1980, TV Movie)

Awards and nominations

References

External links
 Gene Nelson at Apacheland Movie Ranch''
 
 

1920 births
1996 deaths
American male dancers
American male film actors
American male musical theatre actors
American male television actors
American male screenwriters
American television directors
Male actors from Seattle
Deaths from cancer in California
New Star of the Year (Actor) Golden Globe winners
20th-century American male actors
Male actors from Washington (state)
People from Astoria, Oregon
Male actors from Oregon
Film directors from Washington (state)
Film directors from Oregon
Dancers from Washington (state)
Dancers from Oregon
Screenwriters from Washington (state)
Screenwriters from Oregon
20th-century American dancers
20th-century American male writers
20th-century American writers
20th-century American screenwriters
20th-century American male singers
20th-century American singers